Pavlo Olehovych Lukyanchuk (born 19 May 1996) is a Ukrainian professional footballer who plays as a defender for GKS Wikielec.

Club career
Born in Zaporizhya, Lukyanchuk is a product of the Metalurh Zaporizhya and Dynamo Kyiv sportive schools. His first trainer was Mykola Senovalov.

He played for FC Dynamo in the Ukrainian Premier League Reserves and in July 2017 he went on half year loan to FC Olimpik Donetsk in the Ukrainian Premier League. He made his debut in the Ukrainian Premier League for Olimpik Donetsk on 16 July 2017, playing in a match against FC Oleksandriya.

International career
He was called up to the senior Ukraine squad for friendlies against Morocco and Albania in May 2018.

References

External links 

1996 births
Living people
Footballers from Zaporizhzhia
Ukrainian footballers
Ukrainian Premier League players
Ukrainian First League players
Ukrainian expatriate footballers
FC Dynamo Kyiv players
FC Olimpik Donetsk players
Association football defenders
Ukraine youth international footballers
NK Veres Rivne players
Kisvárda FC players
FC Obolon-Brovar Kyiv players
Nemzeti Bajnokság I players
Expatriate footballers in Hungary
Ukrainian expatriate sportspeople in Hungary
Ukraine under-21 international footballers